Anna Vladimirovna Dmitrieva (Russian: Анна Владимировна Дми́триева, born 10 December 1940) is a retired female tennis player who competed for the Soviet Union.

Career
Anna Dmitrieva started playing tennis at the age of 12. In less than a year she won Moscow junior championships as a member of the Dynamo team, and the next year she became also Moscow junior singles champion. At the age of 16 she was allowed to play at senior tournaments, and in a year she became champion of Moscow in singles, women's doubles and mixed doubles.

In 1958, when the USSR joined the International Tennis Federation, Dmitrieva became a member of the first Soviet delegation at the Wimbledon Championships. She reached the final of the junior girls' tournament.

In 1958–1967, Dmitrieva won 18 titles in Soviet championships: five times in singles, nine in women's doubles and four times in mixed doubles. In 1959, 1961, 1962 and 1964 she won the championships in all three categories.

Dmitrieva also won open championships of Czechoslovakia and Hungary (1962), Uganda (1963), Yugoslavia (1966). She also won women's tournament at the Queen's Club in 1963 and Wimbledon Ladies Plate in 1965. She won a number of amateur tournaments in Africa from 1964 to 1968 and the Games of the New Emerging Forces (GANEFO) in Jakarta in 1963.

At the Grand Slam tournaments, her highest success was reaching Wimbledon doubles semis in 1963 with Judy Tegart; they lost to the eventual champions Maria Bueno and Darlene Hard. At the Wimbledon Championships, Dmitrieva also reached the quarterfinals twice in ladies' doubles (in 1960 and 1967) and in mixed doubles in 1967 when she and Alexander Metreveli played the longest game in the tournament's history against Bueno and Ken Fletcher. Dmitrieva also played in the French Open doubles quarterfinals in 1968.

After finishing her player's career in the late 1960s, Dmitrieva worked as a tennis coach for four years and then became a sports journalist and commentator for the Soviet TV and radio.

ITF finals

Singles (12–14)

Doubles (15–7)

Junior Grand Slam finals

Girls' singles: 1 (1-0)

References

External links 
 Anna Dmitrieva at the Peoples.ru portal (in Russian)
 Anna Dmitrieva at the Russian Tennis Federation (in Russian)
 
 

1940 births
Living people
Tennis players from Moscow
Soviet female tennis players
Russian television presenters
Soviet television presenters
Tennis commentators
Russian women television presenters
Russian sports journalists
Russian women journalists